Lydia R. Otero is an Chicanx/Latinx historian and author. They are known for their work on marginalized communities in Arizona.

Education and career
Otero descends from the first family to have a land grant in Arizona. Otero was born in Tucson in 1955 and lived there until graduating from high school in 1973. Otero received a bachelor's degree in 1992 and a master's degree in 1995 from California State University, Los Angeles (CSULA). In 2003 they earned a Ph.D. from the University of Arizona. Otero was a tenured professor in the Department of Mexican American Studies Department at the University of Arizona (2003-2020).

Academic work 
Otero is known for their work on ethnic studies, latinx urbanization and placemaking in latinx communities. In the 1980s Otero was president of Gay and Lesbian Latinos Unidos and Lesbianas Unidas, politically active groups in California. Otero has participated in local activism to remind people about Tucson's past and connection to Mexico, and examined the impact on people living in neighborhoods targeted for urban renewal. In 2010, their book La Calle: Spatial Conflicts and Urban Renewal in a Southwestern City focused on an urban renewal project in Tucson, Arizona which targeted the most densely populated eighty acres in the state and the changes that occurred during the project. The book received a 2011 Southwest Book Award from the Border Regional Library Association, and was reviewed by multiple scholarly publications. In 2019 their book, In the Shadows of The Freeway: Growing Up Brown & Queer, combined personal memoir and family history with historical archives. In 2021, the Pima County Library selected the as one of their annual 44th "Southwest Books of the Year", and the book was reviewed by the Los Angeles Review of Books and the Journal of Arizona History.

Selected publications

Awards and honors 
In 2019, Arizona’s César E. Chávez Holiday Coalition awarded Otero the "'Sí se puede' Legacy Award" for their activism and scholarship focusing on bringing awareness to the history of Arizona and Mexican Americans. In 2021, Otero was named a distinguished lecturer by the Organization of American Historians.

References

External links 

Living people
1955 births
Women historians
California State University, Los Angeles alumni
University of Arizona alumni
University of Arizona faculty